George Wallace Bollinger (10 April 1890 – 10 June 1917) was a New Zealand soldier and diarist. He was born in Omata, Taranaki, New Zealand on 10 April 1890.

References

1890 births
1917 deaths
New Zealand diarists
New Zealand military personnel
People from Taranaki
New Zealand military personnel killed in World War I
20th-century New Zealand writers
20th-century New Zealand male writers
New Zealand Army officers
20th-century diarists